The Ge'nyen Massif, is a mountain in the Shaluli Mountains of western Sichuan province, China. It was first climbed in 1988 by a Japanese team.

The Ge'nyen massif is regarded as the 13th most holy mountain among the 24 holy mountains of Tibetan Buddhism.  Lenggu Monastery is located in a steep valley at the base of the mountain's eastern flank.

Ascents 
In 1988, the first recorded ascent of the Genyen Massif was made by a Japanese team. They were followed by an Italian group who used a new route on the east face. In autumn 2006, Christine Boskoff (of Mountain Madness adventure company) and Charlie Fowler, another well-known American climber and Mountain Madness guide, went missing near Ge'nyen.  It was later determined that they had died in an avalanche while climbing near Lenggu Monastery on Ge'nyen Mountain.

See also
List of Ultras of Tibet, East Asia and neighbouring areas

References

Ge'nyen
Six-thousanders of the Transhimalayas
Mountains associated with Buddhist monasticism